Enver Umyarovich Yulgushov (25 June 1938 – 20 April 2022) was a Russian professional football coach and player. He worked as a president of a coaching council of FC Rostov. He died on 20 April 2022, at the age of 83.

References

External links
 Career summary by KLISF

1938 births
2022 deaths
Soviet footballers
Association football forwards
FC Rostov players
FC SKA Rostov-on-Don players
FC Zenit Saint Petersburg players
Soviet football managers
Russian football managers
Russian Premier League managers
FC Rostov managers
FC Volgar Astrakhan managers